Michał Ilków-Gołąb (born 11 April 1985) is a Polish professional footballer who plays as a right-back for Polish club Chrobry Głogów.

Career
Before the second half of the 2004–05 season, he signed for the reserves of 1. FC Kaiserslautern II in the German Bundesliga.

In 2009, Ilków-Gołąb signed for Polish second division team Stilon Gorzów Wielkopolski, where he made 47 appearances and scored 7 goals. On 1 August 2009, he debuted for Stilon Gorzów Wielkopolski during a 2–1 win over MKS Kluczbork. On 17 October 2009, Ilków-Gołąb scored his first goal for Stilon Gorzów Wielkopolski during a 2–1 loss to Podbeskidzie Bielsko-Biała.

References

External links
 
 
 

1985 births
Living people
Sportspeople from Wrocław
Polish footballers
Association football defenders
Association football wingers
Miedź Legnica players
Zawisza Bydgoszcz players
Stilon Gorzów Wielkopolski players
Śląsk Wrocław players
Polar Wrocław players
Chrobry Głogów players
Regionalliga players
I liga players
II liga players
III liga players
Polish expatriate footballers
Polish expatriate sportspeople in Germany
Expatriate footballers in Germany